Lord Krishna College Of Engineering (LKCE) is an engineering institute located on Pithampur Rd, Rau, Indore, Madhya Pradesh 452003. The institute was established in 2006 by the Lord Krishna Group of Institutions. The institute is affiliated to Dr. A.P.J. Abdul Kalam Technical University. The college code is 224.

Programs
The institute offers a four-year Bachelor of Technology course in the following streams of Engineering:

Campus
The college has a  campus.

Library
The institute has a 900 square metre library with 10,000 volumes. It contains books on engineering, technology, applied sciences, humanities, social sciences, business administration and computer applications.

During examinations, the library is open for 24 hours, on rest of the days the library opens at 11:00 am and closes at around 4:30 pm.

Hostels
The institute has on-campus hostels for boys and girls. The hostels cover an area of 16  acre. The boys hostel has a capacity of 390 while the girls hostel can accommodate 110 students. The hostels are Wi-Fi.

The Wi-Fi network is only activated once the College timings are over so as to avoid bunking of Classes in order to use Internet.

Computer Center
The computer center has 400 computers, all with internet through a 128 kbit/s leased line.

Here as well the internet service is not active as usual. The only lab that has the Internet service activated is located on the ground floor of the C-BLOCK.

Transport
The college's 6 buses ply daily to the nearby areas of Delhi, Gurgaon, Noida and Ghaziabad.

Fee structure
The fee-structure is as per the norms of UPTU and GBTU. We charge fees for all the courses that are specified by the university for the overall development of a student. We do charge ₨ 5000/- as Personality Development Program (PDP) Fees that is carried out in the college.

Co-curricular activities
The college does not promote or carry out any kind of Co-curricular activity.

College sports are organized once every two years.

See also
 List of colleges affiliated with Mahamaya Technical University

References

External links
 Official website

Engineering colleges in Ghaziabad, Uttar Pradesh
Dr. A.P.J. Abdul Kalam Technical University
Private engineering colleges in Uttar Pradesh
2006 establishments in Uttar Pradesh
Educational institutions established in 2006